Fars Air Qeshm is an Iranian cargo airline based in Qeshm.

History
Fars Air Qeshm was established in 2003 with the aim of creating efficient passenger and cargo services serving Qeshm Island. The airline was created with the aid of private sector investment. It temporarily ceased operations in 2013 due to bad management and financial problems. Operations were restarted with new management team in March 2017 based in Tehran with two Boeing 747-281F Combi (Passenger / cargo) aircraft.

Multiple intelligence sources has accused Iranian government of using Fars Air Qeshm aircraft and its cargo route to Beirut in order to transport weapons for Hezbollah and cover up as civilian jets.

Destinations
 

As of March 2017, the airline operated cargo flights to the following destinations:

Fleet
The Fars Air Qeshm fleet consisted of the following aircraft (as of May 2020):

Former fleet
The airline also operated the following aircraft:

Incidents and accidents
In September 2018, Israeli sources published some pictures claiming that a Boeing 747 belonging to Fars Air Qeshm was hit during an Israeli air force operation at Damascus International Airport.

In March 2019, a Boeing 747 belonging to Fars Air Qeshm was damaged, with no injuries reported, at Hamad International Airport in Doha during cargo unloading.

References

External links

Defunct airlines of Iran
Iranian companies established in 2003
Airlines established in 2003